Adverse effects by incidence of trimethoprim/sulfamethoxazole

Common (>1% frequency)

 Fever
 Nausea
 Vomiting
 Diarrhea
 Weight loss
 Rash
 Muscle aches
 Joint pain
 Itch
 Sore mouth
 Hyperkalaemia (high blood potassium)
 Thrombocytopenia (low number of platelets in the blood)

Infrequently (0.1–1.0% frequency)
 Headache
 Jaundice
 Elevated liver transaminases
 Peripheral neuritis
 Drowsiness
 Constipation
 Photosensitivity (light sensitivity)
 Blood dyscrasias (e.g. neutropaenia)

Rare (<0.1% frequency)

 Megaloblastic anaemia
 Methaemoglobinaemia
 Erythema multiforme
 Low blood sugar
 Hepatitis (liver swelling)
 Crystalluria (crystals in the urine)
 Urinary obstruction causing difficulty passing urine
 Lowered mental acuity
 Depression
 Tremor
 Aplastic anaemia
 Haemolytic anaemia
 Hyponatraemia
 Purpura
 Eosinophilia
 Agranulocytosis
 Serum sickness
 Anaphylaxis
 Allergic myocarditis
 Angioedema
 Drug fever
 Periarteritis nodosa
 Hepatic necrosis
 Pancreatitis
 Myelosuppression
 Haemolysis
 Stevens–Johnson syndrome
 Drug reaction with eosinophilia and systemic symptoms
 Toxic epidermal necrolysis
 Ataxia
 Clostridium difficile colitis
 Aseptic meningitis
 Pseudomembranous colitis
 Interstitial nephritis
 Fulminant hepatic necrosis
 Hypersensitivity of the respiratory tract
 Sore throat
 Pallor 
 Arthralgia

Unknown frequency

 Hallucinations
 Cough
 Glossitis
 Stomatitis
 Fatigue
 Insomnia
 Impaired kidney function
 Pulmonary infiltration
 Shortness of breath

Notes

References

Medication side effects